is a retired Japanese Nippon Professional Baseball pitcher. He was with the Hiroshima Toyo Carp and the Nippon Ham Fighters.

External links

1966 births
Living people
Baseball umpires
Hiroshima Toyo Carp players
Japanese baseball players
Nippon Ham Fighters players
Baseball people from Yamaguchi Prefecture